Metropolitan Youth Orchestra of Hong Kong (MYO/MYOHK) is a youth orchestra founded in Hong Kong in 2003. It has collaborated with different artists including Yang Li, Siqing Lu, Nancy Loo, Colleen Lee, Cho-Liang Lin, Michelle Kim and the famous visual theater group Magic Circle Mime Company from the United States. The orchestra gives performances triannually in various venues including the Concert Hall of the Hong Kong Cultural Centre, Tsuen Wan Town Hall and the City Hall, Hong Kong.

In addition to producing music performances, MYO has brought concerts to audience, performing with Korean four-fingered pianist Lee Hee-ah, one-arm violinist Adrian Anantawan and limbless life warrior, Nick Vujicic in 2009 and 2013.

See also 
 List of youth orchestras

References 

Youth orchestras
Hong Kong musical groups
Musical groups established in 2003